Nicholas Podier (died 1 July 1988) was a Liberian soldier and government official in the 1980s.  He was one of the members of the group of soldiers that overthrew the country's government on 12 April 1980.  When the soldiers formed themselves into the People's Redemption Council in order to govern the country, he became the co-chairman of the council and thus the country's Vice Head of State.  In the aftermath of the government's overthrow, he was proclaimed a general, although his precise title is unclear; some sources called him a brigadier general and others a major general.  He died violently in the wake of what former PRC chairman and later President Samuel K. Doe called an attempted coup d'état.  Doe's government announced that Podier had died in a gun battle on one of the country's borders, although other sources questioned Doe's claims and suggested that he had been tortured to death in one of Doe's many attempts to consolidate his power.

References

Year of birth missing
1988 deaths
People's Redemption Council
Place of birth missing